Tata Amaral (born 1960, in São Paulo) is a Brazilian director, writer, producer and actress. She has won various awards across South America, including 'Best director' and 'Best film'.

At a young age, Tata lost the father of her daughter. As a mother and widow, she struggled financially to pursue a career in filmmaking. Under the military dictatorship (a time that saw a rise to censorship of the arts), she participated in rallies orchestrated by the leftist, student movement. Tata received help from Brazilian state programs that financed films throughout the 1980s. She has remained sided with the Worker's Party, as is evident in her work. She became associated with other directors of the 1990s known for restoring Brazilian cinema to a level of commercial and critical success.

Her trilogy (Um Céu de Estrelas, Através de Janela, Antônia) portrays three different stages in a woman's life: birth, maturity, and death. Antônia was picked up by TV Globo and made into a television series, just as City of God had been adapted for television in City of Men. Tata's films are often politically and/or socially charged. Several themes that are recurring in her films include the Brazilian dictatorship, poverty in the favelas, women's role in society and the contemporary urban culture of Brazil.

Filmography
 2014 - Psi (TV series)
 2013 - Trago Comigo
 2011 - Hoje
 2010 - Carnaval dos Deuses (short)
 2009 - Trago Comigo (TV series) 
 2009 - O Rei do Carimã (TV documentary) 
 2007 - Antônia (TV series) 
 2006 - Antônia
 2000 - Através da Janela 
 1996 - Um Céu de Estrelas 
 1991 - Viver a Vida (short) 
 1988 - História Familiar (short) 
 1986 - Poema: Cidade (documentary short)

External links

 Tata Amaral: interview with TimeOut Sào Paulo

Antonia indieWIRE Interview

References
3. Bayman, Louis, and Natália Pinazza. Directory of World Cinema: Brazil. Bristol: Intellect, 2013. Web.

4. Marsh, Leslie Louise. Embodying Citizenship in Brazilian Women's Film, Video, and Literature, 1971 To 1988. Diss. U of        Michigan, 2008. Ann Arbor, MI: UMI Microform, 2009. Print.

5. Marsh, Leslie L. Brazilian Women's Filmmaking: From Dictatorship to Democracy. Urbana: U of Illinois, 2013. Board of Trustees of the University of Illinois. Web.

1961 births
Living people
Brazilian film directors